Static Shock Records is an English independent record label, gig promoter, and distributor specialising in underground punk founded in London in 2008. Since 2012 the label has organised a 'Static Shock Weekend' festival most years at different venues in the city.

History

Static Shock was founded in London by Tom Ellis in 2008. Its first release was a 7” from the Canadian power pop band Dangerloves, after seeing the band play at Toronto's Fucked Up Weekend, now called Not Dead Yet Fest. The label's next release was a 7” from his own band, The Shitty Limits, called Here Are The Limits. The label has since released music by bands from all over Europe, North America, and Australia. 

Since 2012 the label has organised the 'Static Shock Weekend' festival most years at different venues in the city. Bands to play the festival include Iron Lung, Pharmakon, Limp Wrist, Sauna Youth, and Sheer Mag.

Acclaimed releases
Debuting on 6 July 2017 via streaming by NPR Music and physically released 14 July 2017 in a co-release with the Wilsuns Recording Company, Static Shock Records released Need To Feel Your Love by Sheer Mag. It received acclaim from reviewers, some of them calling it one of the best LPs of 2017.

Need To Feel Your Love was included in the top 30 of year-end lists of publications such as Rolling Stone, NME, Spin, Slant Magazine, Noisey, and Paste.

On 19 October 2018 the label released "Raise Your Voice Joyce: Contemporary Shouts From Contemporary Voices", a compilation of music covertly recorded by the Canadian band Fucked Up, though uncredited, with lyrics and vocals performed by members of UK and European punk bands including Nekra, Good Throb, Arms Race, Sauna Youth, Terrible Feelings, and more.

Artists on Static Shock Records
Ajax
Beta Blockers
Blazing Eye
Bootlicker
Career Suicide
Chubby and the Gang
Cold Meat 
Creem
Dangerloves
Disguise
Efialtis
Frau
Hygiene
Idiota Civilizzato
Impalers
Krimewatch
The Love Triangle
No
The Number Ones
Perspex Flesh
Powerplant
Sarcasm
Sauna Youth
Sievehead
Sheer Mag
S.H.I.T.
The Shitty Limits
Strutter
TV Crime
Tyrannamen
Uranium Club
Urban Blight
Violent Future
Violent Reaction
Warthog
Young Governor

References

Underground punk scene in the United Kingdom
British independent record labels
Record labels established in 2008
Punk record labels